Sieniawa is a village in the administrative district of Gmina Raba Wyżna, within Nowy Targ County, Lesser Poland Voivodeship, in southern Poland.

The village has a population of 1,900.

References

Sieniawa